Doe Hill is an unincorporated community in Highland County, Virginia, United States. Doe Hill has a post office with ZIP code 24433. The community was named for the great number of does that could be seen in the nearby hills in earlier times.

Doe Hill is often mentioned in the 1970s family drama, The Waltons, by character Corabeth Godsey, played by Ronnie Claire Edwards.

References

Unincorporated communities in Highland County, Virginia
Unincorporated communities in Virginia